Kevin Kerr (born September 18, 1967) is a Canadian retired professional hockey player and former head coach of the Flint Generals of the United/International Hockey League.

Career 
Kerr was drafted in the third round, 56th overall of the 1986 NHL Draft by the Buffalo Sabres.

On February 4, 2015, Kerr was named the inaugural head coach of the Macon Mayhem of the Southern Professional Hockey League. The club played their first game in October 2015. In his second season as Macon's head coach he won the SPHL's coach of the year, and went on to win the league championship, giving Macon its first professional sports title since the 1962 Macon Peaches baseball team. 

Kerr left the Mayhem after the 2017–18 season and was named the head coach of the Greenville Swamp Rabbits in the ECHL. The Swamp Rabbits did not renew his contract after the 2019–20 season and he returned to Macon, where he then won his second SPHL coach of the year for the abbreviated 2020–21 season after he led the team to a regular season championship. Kerr resigned following the season due to personal and family reasons.

Career statistics

References

External links 

1967 births
Living people
Anaheim Bullfrogs players
Birmingham Bulls (ECHL) players
Buffalo Sabres draft picks
Canadian ice hockey right wingers
Cincinnati Cyclones (ECHL) players
Elmira Jackals (UHL) players
Flint Generals players
Fort Wayne Komets players
Ice hockey people from Ontario
Kalamazoo Wings (UHL) players
Mobile Mysticks players
North Bay Centennials players
Orlando Jackals players
Phoenix Mustangs players
Phoenix Roadrunners (IHL) players
Portland Pirates players
Quad City Mallards (UHL) players
Rochester Americans players
Rockford IceHogs (UHL) players
Sportspeople from North Bay, Ontario
Toledo Storm players
Utica Devils players
Windsor Spitfires players
Canadian expatriate ice hockey players in the United States